Lagos State Traffic Management Authority is a Lagos State-owned agency under the Ministry of Transportation.
The agency was established on the 15th of July, 2000 to transform the state transportation system to ensure free flow of traffic in the state and also reduce road accidents. The current head of the agency is Mr. Bolaji Oreagba who before his appointment was the Director of Operations in LASTMA.

History 
The Lagos State Traffic Management Authority, LASTMA for short, is a traffic management agency in Lagos State, Nigeria that was created by the former governor of the State, Asiwaju Bola Ahmed Tinubu to help maintain the level of sanity on Lagos major roads.

Mission 
To promote a state-wide culture of traffic regulation, control, and management, as well as to ensure smooth traffic flow on Lagos roads.

Vision 
To reduce deaths and economic losses caused by road traffic accidents and delays on Lagos State's public highways by implementing modern traffic management techniques to bring order and control to the state's road.

References

Transport in Lagos
Government agencies established in 2000
2000 establishments in Nigeria
Organizations based in Lagos
Traffic Management Authority